The Derby della Mole is the local derby played out between Turin's most prominent football clubs, Juventus and Torino. It is also known as the Derby di Torino or the Turin Derby in English. It is named after the Mole Antonelliana, a major landmark in the city and the architectural symbol of the Piedmontese capital. It is the first derby of Italian football and the oldest ongoing meeting between two teams based in the same city in Italy.

The match between the two clubs represented until the First World War the juxtaposition of two opposing social classes. Juventus, founded in 1897 by students of a prestigious high school in Turin, soon became akin to the bourgeois in the town especially after enduring bond with the Agnelli family, which began in 1923, during which time they were also supported by the aristocracy of the region. Torino instead was born in 1906 from a division within Juventus, at the hands of dissidents who joined forces with another team from the city, Football Club Torinese, who identified with the then-early industrial world. In the 1960s and 1970s, these differences had eased considerably, partly as a result of the great migration to Turin about forty years earlier, but did not disappear: Juventus has since transcended its status as the symbol of the bourgeois and elite class to become a global phenomenon while Torino still largely retains an exclusively local fanbase.

The colours of the two teams also contribute, in small part, to this distinction: the Bianconeri, originally pink and black, adopted their jerseys from Notts County all the way from England, while the Granata dusted off the colours of the "Brigade Savoia", that two centuries earlier had liberated the then capital of the Duchy of Savoy. Both clubs, however, featured within their emblems a raging bull, taken from the city's coat of arms: Juventus as a bond with their origins, while Torino adopted it as their identity until 2017 when Juventus introduced a J shaped logo no longer featuring the bull.

History

The Turin derby was first played on 13 January 1907. It was also the first competitive match of Torino after its founding on 3 December 1906. The rivalry stems from the fact that Torino was founded through a merger of Football Club Torinese and a group of Juventus dissidents, led by major financier Alfred Dick. It is said that prior to the first derby, Dick was locked inside the changing room, causing him to miss the game and having to listen to updates via players and staff.

Since then, the derby has not been played in Serie A thirteen times: twelve due to Torino being in Serie B, and once after Juventus were relegated following the 2006 Italian football scandal.  In addition to the derby against the Granata, the Bianconeri have played many derbies in the top flight with other city teams that no longer exist such as R.S. Ginnastica Torino, Sport Club Audace Torino and Football Club Pastore. In the first two editions of the Italian football championship, the original derbies of Turin were the ones played between Torinese, Ginnastica Torino and Internazionale Torino, before the latter merged with Torinese in 1900.

During the post-World War II years, the rivalry and vast difference in clubs' fortunes came to represent a class divide in the Piedmont region, as noted by Soldati. The fans of Torino usually represent the proletariat, while Juventus the bourgeoisie. With the mass migration to Turin, a major industrial center of northern Italy, in the 1960s and 1970s, many fans of Juventus arrived from southern Italy and took up employment with the Agnelli family – the owners of FIAT. Thus, they also saw Juventus as "the team of the boss" or the "team of Fiat". Torino would stand to represent the "original" spirit of Piedmont, or the purest Torinesità and to this day, it draws its supporters from a predominantly local fanbase, compared to Juventus, which enjoys widespread support even outside of Italy. Today, the differences remain, even if they are less prominent, due to Torino regularly teetering between Serie A and Serie B since the second half of the 1990s.

As of 28 February 2023, Juventus have won the derby 110 times and Torino have won it 73 times. Despite the overall results of the derby generally in favor of Juventus, historically, there have been periods where Torino have prevailed; between 1912 and 1914, in the space of three encounters, Torino submerged Juventus under a heavy "coat" of 23 goals—in which Juventus suffered its heaviest defeat in history, an 0–8 result on 17 November 1912, and especially during the 1940s, thanks to the team led by Valentino Mazzola, known as the Grande Torino. The end of the twenties signaled a period of early dominance of Juventus, who had just passed under the Agnelli, and left their rivals with only three victories in twenty matches; subsequently, the Superga tragedy of 1949 and the consequent technical impoverishment of Torino, was followed by a period more favourable for Juventus in the 1950s, culminating in the derby of 20 April 1952, won 6–0.

The 1970s witnessed the revival of Torino, when Juventus remained without a win in the derby for nearly six years (from December 1973 to March 1979) and Torino established a record of 4 wins in a row in a single championship (1975–76). Coinciding with Torino's economic difficulties (especially at the end of the 1990s), Juventus inflicted heavy defeats (5–0 of 3 December 1995). Recent history has seen a marked dominance of Juventus, so much so that Torino's 2–1 victory on 26 April 2015 was their first derby success in twenty years.

Official match results 
 3P = Third place play-off
 SF = Semi-final
 QF = Quarter-final
 R16 = Round of 16
 R32 = Round of 32
 GS = Group stage
 R1 = Round 1
 R2 = Round 2

Incidents
In 1967 after a derby Torino won 4–0, incensed Juventus fans vandalized the grave of former Torino player Gigi Meroni.

On 27 March 1983, Torino, down 0–2, overturned the deficit in the 75th minute by scoring three goals in just over three minutes to win 3–2. Another remarkable encounter took place on 14 October 2001, when Torino, trailing 0–3 at halftime, came back to tie the game 3–3 (taking advantage of a penalty miss by Juventus player Marcelo Salas, who would have scored 4–3 to Juventus). This was made famous by Torino midfielder Riccardo Maspero, who grooved a hole on the penalty spot before Salas kicked it. In the return leg, that ended 2–2, Juventus midfielder Enzo Maresca notably celebrated a late equaliser by parodying the 'horns of the bull' (the bull being the Torino's club symbol), a gesture usually done by former Torino captain Marco Ferrante.

Prior to a derby match during the 2007–08 season, riots took place and chaos broke out as police tried to control the hooligans involved. There were 40 arrests made and 2 injured policemen. Rubbish bins were set on fire and many cars and shops vandalized as a result.

On 1 December 2012 the two clubs met in Serie A for the first time in three seasons and it was the first derby hosted at the Juventus Stadium. Prior to kick-off, several fans from both sides were arrested for starting a brawl and vandalism. Juventus won 3–0, with all three goals scored by Turin-born Juventus youth products Claudio Marchisio (2) and Sebastian Giovinco (1). The match was marred by a red card, a €10,000 fine for Juventus for an offensive banner some of its supporters had displayed about the infamous Superga air disaster and a €25,000 fine for Torino after their fans vandalised stadium toilets and seats.

Statistics

Top scorers

Below is the list of top scorers in all official competitions of the Turin derby:

Most managerial wins
Below is the list of club manager wins in all official competitions of the Turin derby:

Records
 Match with most goals: 14, Torino 8–6 Juventus on 19 February 1913.
 Victory with the largest margin in favour of Torino: 0–8 on 17 November 1912.
 Victory with the largest margin in favour of Juventus: 6–0 on 20 April 1952.
 Most wins in a row: Juventus – 7 – from 25 October 2008 until 30 November 2014.
 Consecutive draws: 4, from 3 April 1977 until 19 November 1978.
 Greater number of games without a win: Torino, 17, from 3 December 1995 until 30 November 2014.
 Most minutes without conceding a goal: Juventus, 931 minutes, from 24 February 2002 until 30 November 2014.
 Fastest goal: Valentino Mazzola, Torino, after 1' (18 June 1944).
 Best comeback win: Juventus, from 0–2 to 4–2 (7 March 1982). 
 Best comeback: Torino, from 0–3 to 3–3 (14 October 2001).
 Top scorer in a single derby: Hans Kämpfer, Torino, 4 goals (3 February 1907).
 Scorer in multiple consecutive derby: Felice Borel, Juventus, 6 goals, from 4 December 1932 until 10 March 1935.
 Most derbies disputed in a calendar year: 6 (1988), including 3 in the league, 2 in Coppa Italia and 1 play-off for admission to the UEFA Cup.
 Record attendance: 70,200, Juventus 0–1 in Turin (28 October 1962).
 Juventus won at least once in each of the twelve decades in which the derby was played, while Torino failed to win in the decade 2000–2009.
 Unbeaten goalkeeper Gianluigi Buffon, Juventus, 864 minutes.

Head-to-head ranking in Serie A (1930–2022)

• Total: Torino with 16 higher finishes, Juventus with 61 higher finishes (as of the end of the 2021–22 season).

Notes:
 Both teams qualified for the final round of 8 teams in 1946  
 Both teams finished with the same number of points in 1956, but Torino had better goal difference

Trophies

Bibliography

References

External links

Mole
Juventus F.C.
Torino F.C.
Football in Turin